Clarence Skelton Wimble (22 April 1861 – 28 January 1930) was a South African cricketer who played one Test match in 1892.

A right-handed batsman and superior fieldsman, Wimble's first-class cricket career comprised just two matches in eleven months. His debut came in a Currie Cup match in April 1891 when Kimberley came to the Old Wanderers ground at Johannesburg and defeated Transvaal. In a timeless match lasting seven days, Wimble top-scored for Transvaal in the first innings with 62 and followed with 46 in the second innings. This performance contributed to his selection for South Africa's sole Test against England in 1891-92, played at Newlands in Cape Town in March 1892. In a three-day match completely dominated by the visitors – England won by an innings and 189 runs – Wimble had the ignominy of scoring a pair, caught in the first innings and stumped in the second.

References

External links
 
 Clarence Wimble at CricketArchive

1861 births
1930 deaths
People from Graaff-Reinet
South African people of British descent
South Africa Test cricketers
South African cricketers
Gauteng cricketers
Cricketers from the Eastern Cape